Bloody Hammers is an American hard rock band, founded in 2010 by Anders Manga in Transylvania County, North Carolina, United States. Manga is the primary producer, singer, songwriter, and instrumentalist. Bloody Hammers' music straddles a range of genres including heavy metal, gothic rock, doom metal, and psychedelic rock. The touring band features a revolving lineup with Manga and keyboardist Devallia being the only permanent live members. Devallia also contributes keyboard parts to recordings and is sometimes credited as a co-producer.

In 2012, the self-titled Bloody Hammers album was released along with a video on YouTube for the song “Fear No Evil”. In 2014, the band signed to Napalm Records and released their second album, Under Satan's Sun, in May. This album was followed by a European tour. The band's sixth album, Songs of Unspeakable Terror, was released in 2021. Their seventh album, Washed in the Blood, was released on October 14, 2022.

Members
Current members
 Anders Manga – lead vocals, guitar, bass (2010–present)
 Devallia – organ, piano (2010–present)

Former touring-only musicians
 Bill Fischer – guitars (Under Satan's Sun Tour 2014)
 Doza Mendoza – drums (Under Satan's Sun Tour 2014)

Discography

Studio albums
 Bloody Hammers (2012)
 Spiritual Relics (2013)
 Under Satan's Sun (2014)
 Lovely Sort of Death (2016)
 The Summoning (2019)
 Songs of Unspeakable Terror (2021)
 Washed in the Blood (2022)

EP
 The Horrific Case of Bloody Hammers (2017) (Napalm Records)

Music videos
 Fear No Evil (2012)
 What's Haunting You (2013)
 The Town That Dreaded Sundown (2014)
 Welcome to the Horror Show (2014)
 Death Does Us Part (2014)
 Necromancer (2014)
 The Reaper Comes (2016)
 Lights Come Alive (2016)
 Ether (2016)
 Now the Screaming Starts (2019)
 Let Sleeping Corpses Lie (2019)
 From Beyond the Grave (2019)
 A Night to Dismember (2020)
 Hands of the Ripper (2021)
 Not of this Earth (2021)

References
Interview with Anders Manga at AXS
Review of 'Under Satan's Sun' on Metal Injection 
'Death Does Us Part' Video Premiere on Loudwire"
Bloody Disgusting's premiere of "The Town That Dreaded Sundown" by Bloody Hammers
'Under Satan's Sun review on Planet Mosh
Interview at Prog-Sphere
Review at Austin Chronicle 
Interview at Guitar World
Interview at Meta Temple
Interview at Zombie Hamster
August 2014 Interview with Metal-Temple.com
May 2014 Interview with KAMP Arizona State Student Radio
Interview with Harvest Moon Music 2013
Bloody Hammers' 'Lovely Sort of Death' Is Gothier Than Thou

External links
 

American doom metal musical groups
American gothic metal musical groups
Heavy metal musical groups from North Carolina
2010 establishments in North Carolina
Musical groups from North Carolina
Occult rock musical groups